The A130 is a major road in England linking Little Waltham, near Chelmsford, the county town of Essex, with Canvey Island in the south of that county. It is a primary route for most of its length, only losing that status south of the A13 junction at Sadlers Farm roundabout as it nears its terminus on Canvey Island. It was originally a much longer cross-country route (see History).

Route
The present route can be divided into three main sections, plus an overlap with the A12. The road now starts near the village of Little Waltham (to the north of Chelmsford) at a roundabout with the A131, which heads north-east to Braintree, and the B1008, a former A130 alignment heading south into northern Chelmsford, and north towards Great Dunmow (this section only declassified as recently as early 2008). Either side of this junction, the B1008/A130 route is quite recent, named Essex Regiment Way, and at the Chelmsford end, the A130 intersects with the other routes into northern Chelmsford, the A1016 and A138, the latter junction almost merging with the junction between the A130 and the A12 Chelmsford Bypass, a dual carriageway. Here, the A12 multiplexes/overlaps with the A130 for a few miles round the eastern edge of Chelmsford.

 
The second section starts a few miles to the south. The A1114 road is the old road heading back into town, but the A130 road reappears heading south away from the Chelmsford area as a new dual carriageway opened as recently as 2002. This is a "secret motorway" complete with hard shoulders, but classified as A-road.

The new road here more or less follows the same path as the World War II GHQ Line hence the many pillboxes visible alongside the carriageway between the Howe Green and the A132 junctions. An older section of dual carriageway extends as far south as the A13 at the Sadlers Hall Farm (Sadlers Farm), a roundabout near Benfleet. As with the A13 from London, the primary route section of the A130 ends here too.

South of the Sadlers Farm roundabout, the final leg of the A130 continues as a non-primary single-carriageway route into Canvey Island on the River Thames. Canvey Way is a causeway connecting "mainland" with island, and connects with the older road through the island, the B1014. On the island itself, a final short stretch of dual carriageway leads to the built-up area where the road turns east and becomes single, before meeting the B1014 again at a one-way system in the central area, incorporating the High Street.

History
The A130 was a much longer route. It originally started on the old A10 just south of Cambridge at Trumpington, and ended on the A129 near Rayleigh. When the M11 Cambridge Western Bypass section was built in the early 1980s, the A10 through Cambridge was reclassified as A1309, whilst the A130 was truncated as far south as Great Dunmow on the A120, due east of London Stansted Airport. The section between Trumpington and Stump Cross (M11 junction 9A, the A11 spur) became A1301, whilst the section between there and Great Dunmow became an extension of the B184. The A11 was also reclassified to minor A-roads and B-roads at this time (qv.). In early 2008, the section between Great Dunmow and Little Waltham was declassified to become an extension of the B1008, itself a product of earlier re-routing.

During the mid-1980s, the A12 Chelmsford Bypass opened and this led to the A130 multiplexing with the former for a few miles to the north and east of Chelmsford. In more recent times, a new road between the village of Howe Green and the Chelmsford suburb of Springfield, Essex Regiment Way, directs traffic away from the northern suburbs. The original A130 through the villages north of Chelmsford and the town itself followed what is now an unclassified road, then B1008 (now extended to include the northern section of Essex Regiment Way), a short section of A1016, and then A1060 and A1114 to the southeast, the latter two forming sections of the same dual carriageway, incorporating a tidal flow flyover at Army & Navy Roundabout.

At the southern end, the route was extended as far as the A13 by the 1970s, and then onto Canvey Island via the Canvey Way causeway. The partially dual carriageway section between Chelmsford and the A127 was replaced by a new road (much of it "secret motorway") in 2002–3. The older road is now unclassified through the village of Rettendon (formerly a notorious accident blackspot), and then A1245 between the A132 and A127 junctions.

In early summer 2016, work was undertaken on the stretch between Rettendon and Howe Green (in both directions) to turn the existing hard shoulders into 3rd lanes, as the traffic volume had reached 50,000 vehicles per day. The resurfacing and re-marking of the hard shoulders needed to turn them into 3rd lanes was completed, but problems were then discovered in the crash barriers and subsequently the strength of the embankments supporting the road. The new lanes were then coned off, and the road left at 2 lanes in each direction with no hard shoulder. As of 18 April 2018, the southbound lane has been fully re-opened whilst work continues on the northbound side.

External links
Roads x 10 entry on the SABRE website
South East England road photos

References

Transport in Uttlesford
Transport in the City of Chelmsford
Transport in Rochford District
Transport in the Borough of Basildon
Transport in Castle Point
Roads in England